Mątki may refer to:
Mątki, Pomeranian Voivodeship, Poland
Mątki, Warmian-Masurian Voivodeship, Poland